The 2009-10 season in Danish 2nd Division was divided in two groups. The two winners, Brønshøj BK and FC Hjørring were promoted to the 2010–11 Danish 1st Division, along with the runner-up from the West-division Hobro IK, after they beat their Eastern counterpart B.93 5–1 on aggregate in a two-legged promotion play-off. Relegation was decided when Otterup B&I from the West division lost 4–5 to BK Skjold in another two-legged match-up between the bottom teams from the divisions. This relegation was later annulled, as 1st Division relegatee BK Frem went bankrupt, forcing a further two-level-relegation to the Copenhagen Series and leaving an extra place open for Otterup.

On 6 March 2010 it was decided that the eight Superliga clubs' second teams should be withdrawn from the Second Division at the end of the season and be transferred to a separate reserves competition. Therefore, the relegation to the Denmark Series was reduced from six teams to one, and the promotion the other way increased from six to nine. A two-legged relegation play-off between the two 16th ranked teams would decide the relegation.

Participants

East

League table

West

League table

Promotion game

First leg

Second leg

Hobro IK win 5 – 1 on aggregate and are promoted to the 2010–11 Danish 1st Division

Relegation game
The relegation of Otterup B&I for losing this playoff was later cancelled, as BK Frem went bankrupt and left another place open in the 2nd Division.

First leg

Second leg

Otterup B&I lose 4 – 5 on aggregate and are relegated to the 2010–11 Danish Series (later annulled)

See also
2009-10 in Danish football

References

External links
  Danish FA

Danish 2nd Division seasons
3
Danish